Lindokuhle Mfeka (born 29 March 1994) is a South African soccer player who plays for Oakland Roots in the USL Championship.

Career

College 
Mfeka played four years of college soccer at the University of South Florida between 2013 and 2016. He spent a brief period with USL PDL side Reading United in 2016.

Professional
On 13 January 2017, Mfeka was selected 28th overall in the 2017 MLS SuperDraft by San Jose Earthquakes.

Mfeka made his professional debut on 6 May 2017, whilst on loan to San Jose's United Soccer League affiliate Reno 1868. Mfeka started in a 4–0 win over Phoenix Rising FC, assisting on two goals.

He made his MLS debut as an injury time substitute on 1 July 2017 in San Jose's 2–1 victory over the LA Galaxy at Stanford Stadium.

On 13 December 2017, Mfeka signed with Reno 1868 ahead of their 2018 season. He was released by Reno following their 2019 season.

After a year without a club, Mfeka joined Oakland Roots on 20 January 2021, ahead of their inaugural USL Championship season.

References

External links

Bulls bio

1994 births
Living people
South African soccer players
South Florida Bulls men's soccer players
Reading United A.C. players
San Jose Earthquakes players
Reno 1868 FC players
Association football midfielders
San Jose Earthquakes draft picks
Major League Soccer players
USL Championship players
Sportspeople from Durban
Oakland Roots SC players